Yine Sensiz (Again Without You) is the 1992 album of the Turkish pop singer Tarkan. It was released in Turkey. This was his debut album and launched him onto the Turkish pop scene, which was modest at the time. Last 3 tracks were added during its re-release in 1993. By 1994, the album sold over 600,000 copies officially, and an additional 400,000 copies illegally.

Track listing 

Remix Adnan Göykem

Credits
 Music direction, arrangements: Ozan Çolakoğlu
 Mixing: Riza Erekli
 Publisher: Onur Ofset
 Photography: Sibel Arcan

Music videos
 X – "Çok Ararsın Beni" (There was a video filmed for this even before Kıl Oldum's, but it is rumoured that it was taken off air by Tarkan. It was the cover of Boney M's "No More Chain Gang".)
 1992 – "Kıl Oldum" (There were two videos filmed for this, one with children and another with a monkey.)
 1993 – "Kimdi?" (There were two videos made for this track: one in which Tarkan is a post-officer and the other in which he is wearing yellow trousers, like in Kıl Oldum's video) It was the cover of Khaled's "Didi".
 1993 – "Gelip de Halimi Gördün Mü?" (It was the cover of Los Kjarkas' "Wayayay")
 1993 – "Vazgeçemem" (There were three videos made for this track: the one whose background is a fountain, another in which Tarkan sings in a restaurant, and a simple white backgrounded video, which was the cover of Gipsy Kings"' "No Volvere")
 1993 – "Çok Ararsın Beni (Remix)"
 1993 – "Söz Verdim"

Miscellaneous information
The 1992 edition was only released as a cassette. It was re-released in CD format in 1993 with three new remixes.

Notes

External links
 Tarkan Tevetoğlu – Tarkan Lyric TR
 Tarkan Translations
 Album and Song Lyrics Information in English
 Tarkan Tevetoğlu (Tarkan Fan Club)

Tarkan (singer) albums
1992 debut albums